Jaroslav Kocián (22 February 1883 in Ústí nad Orlicí – 8 March 1950 in Prague) was a Czech violinist, classical composer and teacher.

Life 
He studied in Prague under Otakar Ševčík, and is considered together with Jan Kubelík as the most important representative of "Ševčík´s school".

An interpreter of violin compositions of Johann Sebastian Bach. He is especially noted for his compositions for the violin, which have been recorded most often by his student Josef Suk.

He taught at the Prague Conservatory.

He recorded for Columbia Records.

Discography

No.1422, Serenade (Gabriel Pierné)
No.1423, Canzonetta (Alfredo D'Ambrosio)
No.1458, Elfin Dance (Leo Spies)

References

External links
 

1883 births
1950 deaths
Czech classical composers
Czech male classical composers
Czech classical musicians
Czech classical violinists
Male classical violinists
Czech music educators
Czech Freemasons
Violin pedagogues
20th-century classical violinists
20th-century Czech male musicians
People from Ústí nad Orlicí
Czechoslovak musicians